Edward Cotter (27 June 1902 – 11 December 1972) was an Irish Fianna Fáil politician. He unsuccessfully contested the Cork West constituency June 1949 by-election caused by the death of Timothy J. Murphy but was elected to Dáil Éireann as a Fianna Fáil Teachta Dála (TD) for the Cork West constituency at the 1954 general election. He moved to the Cork South-West at the 1961 general election and continued to hold his seat until he retired at the 1969 general election.

References

1902 births
1972 deaths
Fianna Fáil TDs
Members of the 15th Dáil
Members of the 16th Dáil
Members of the 17th Dáil
Members of the 18th Dáil
Politicians from County Cork